George "Hadley" Foster, (born June 18, 1975) is the American athletic administrator who was the head men's volleyball coach at Quincy University. He spent eight seasons as head coach, ranking as the program's all-time leader in wins.

Background 
Foster, who is from Shelley, Idaho, played high school basketball at Shelley High School. Foster's collegiate coaching experience started with a six-year stint at NCAA Division I Idaho State University, where earned both his bachelor's and master's degrees and also completing his undergraduate studies in physical education in 1996 before finishing his graduate work in athletic administration in 1998.

References

External links
University, Quincy IL. "Hadley Foster Bio." RSS. Quincy University, 08 Sept. 2014. Web. 14 Oct. 2014.

Volleyball coaches
Quincy University
1975 births
Living people
People from Shelley, Idaho